The Ipswich Built-up Area is a Built up Area, a statistical unit devised by the UK Office of National Statistics to organise data for an urban area which extends from the town of Ipswich to Kesgrave, Woodbridge, Bramford and Martlesham Heath in Suffolk, England. The area takes in the borough of Ipswich, parts of the East Suffolk and part of the Mid Suffolk. The area was recorded at having a population of 178,835.

According to the 2011 census, the gender makeup of the population was 88,482 male and 90,353 female. The ethnic makeup of the whole urban area was 91% white and 4% Asian. Other ethnic minorities were around 5%. The religious make up of the whole area was:

Sub divisions 
In 2001 the built-up-area included the sub divisions of Ipswich and Martlesham Heath, while in the 2011 census it included Ipswich, Bramford, Kesgrave (which included Martlesham Heath), Martlesham and Woodbridge.

References

Ipswich
Geography of Suffolk
Urban areas of England